Moqdar (also Romanized as Moqaddar; also known as Mūkdār and Nūq Dar) is a village in Miyandasht Rural District, in the Central District of Darmian County, South Khorasan Province, Iran. At the 2006 census, its population was 94, in 35 families.

References 

Populated places in Darmian County